Delta Phoenicis, Latinized from δ Phoenicis, is a single, yellow-hued star in the southern constellation of Phoenix. With an apparent visual magnitude of 3.93, it is visible to the naked eye. Based upon an annual parallax shift of 22.95 mas as seen from Earth, it is located 142 light years from the Sun. The star is moving closer to the Sun with a radial velocity of −7 km/s.

This is a G-type giant star with a stellar classification of G8.5 IIIb. It is a red clump star, which means it has reached the stage of its  evolution where it is generating energy through helium fusion at its core. At its estimated distance, this yields a physical size of about 10.5 times the radius of the Sun. It is around 3.7 billion years old with 1.46 times the mass of the Sun. The star is radiating 60 times the Sun's luminosity from its enlarged photosphere at an effective temperature of 4,762 K.

References

G-type giants
Horizontal-branch stars
Phoenix (constellation)
High-proper-motion stars
Phoenicis, Delta
Durchmusterung objects
009362
007083
0440